Abbado is a surname. Notable people with the surname include:

Claudio Abbado (1933–2014), Italian conductor, brother of Marcello
Marcello Abbado (1926–2020), Italian pianist, composer, conductor, and teacher
Roberto Abbado (born 1954), Italian conductor, son of Marcello